"Let's Go Higher" is a song co-written and recorded by Canadian country music artist Johnny Reid. It was released in September 2010 as the second single from his 2010 album A Place Called Love. The song reached No. 58 on the Canadian Hot 100 in December 2010.

"Let's Go Higher" was nominated for Single of the Year at the 2012 Juno Awards.

Music video
The music video was directed by Ante Kovac and premiered in November 2010.

Chart performance

References

2010 singles
Johnny Reid songs
EMI Records singles
Songs written by Brent Maher
Song recordings produced by Brent Maher
2010 songs
Songs written by Johnny Reid